The Southward Car Museum is an automobile museum and event centre in Otaihanga, New Zealand. It was established by Len Southward in the 1970s to house his collection of over 450 vehicles and several aircraft, and is now run by a charitable trust. The museum is just north of Paraparaumu on the Kapiti Coast, about an hour's drive from Wellington and situated just west of the North Island Main Trunk railway and State Highway 1, on Otaihanga Road.

The purpose-built building includes a 6000 square metre exhibition hall, engineering workshop, gift shop and small cafe, all set in park-like grounds. The building also incorporates the 474-seat Southward Theatre, which features the 1929 Wurlitzer Unit Orchestra theatre organ that was originally installed in the Civic Theatre in Auckland.

History
The core-car collection was the personal work of Sir Len Southward and his wife Vera. The couple began collecting cars in 1956 with a Ford Model T.

Having established the largest private car collection in Australasia, in 1976 Len purchased a  site on which to establish a museum open to the public.
Ground was broken on the museum site in 1971, but construction wasn't given council consent until 1977. The museum officially opened on 22 December 1979. 

In 2020 a new exhibit in the museum was opened, detailing Len and Vera's lives and achievements, including new digital and material installations.

Collection

The museum has about 450 vehicles, which include:

 1895 Benz Velo, imported to New Zealand in 1900.
 1915 Stutz Indianapolis race car
 Gull-winged Mercedes-Benz
 1934 Cadillac V-16 Town Cabriolet - once owned by American actress Marlene Dietrich
 1939 Mercedes-Benz 770 - believed to have been intended as a gift for Edward VIII after the planned German invasion of Britain
 1950 Cadillac Sixty Special "gangster special" - belonged to American gangster Mickey Cohen, fitted with armoured body panels and bulletproof plate glass 1½ inches (40 mm) thick.
 DeLorean - best known from the Back to the Future film series, the only DeLorean on public display in New Zealand.
 2007 Subaru Impreza WRX STI Rally Car- Driven by Ken Block for the 2007 NZRC Season and Rally New Zealand

References

External links

 Southward Car Museum
 WellingtonNZ Tourism

Museums in the Wellington Region
Automobile museums in New Zealand
Kapiti Coast District
Buildings and structures in the Kapiti Coast District